The 1990–91 Winnipeg Jets season was the Jets' 19th season, their 12th season in the National Hockey League. The Jets placed fifth in the Smythe and did not qualify for the 1991 Stanley Cup playoffs.

Off-season
The Winnipeg Jets made a blockbuster trade at the 1990 NHL Entry Draft on June 15, 1990, sending Dale Hawerchuk and their first-round pick in the same draft to the Buffalo Sabres in exchange for Phil Housley, Scott Arniel, Jeff Parker and the Sabres' first-round pick in the same draft. Hawerchuk, who had been with the Jets since the 1981–82 season, was coming off a season with 26 goals and 81 points, both career-lows, in 79 games.  Housley, a defenceman, had 21 goals and 81 points in 80 games for the Sabres in the 1989–90 season, while Arniel had 18 goals and 32 points in 79 games with Buffalo. Arniel had previously played with the Jets for five seasons, from 1981 to 1986.

At the 1990 NHL Entry Draft, the team selected Keith Tkachuk from Malden Catholic High School, a high school in Massachusetts. Another notable pick by Winnipeg was Alexei Zhamnov in the fourth round.

On September 6, 1990, the Jets traded Laurie Boschman to the New Jersey Devils in exchange for Bob Brooke. Boschman had been with Winnipeg since the 1982–83 season and was coming off a 10-goal, 27-point season in 1989–90.  Brooke had 8 goals and 18 points in 35 games with the Devils. However, the next day, he announced his retirement from professional hockey. As compensation, the Jets then received the Devils' fifth-round pick in the 1991 NHL Entry Draft.

On September 30, 1990, Winnipeg traded Peter Taglianetti to the Minnesota North Stars in exchange for future considerations. Taglianetti had 3 goals and 9 points in 49 games with the Jets in 1989–90.

The Jets changed their primary logo and uniforms for the 1990–91 season, however, the team stayed with the same colours of blue, red and white.

With the departure of Hawerchuk, Randy Carlyle and Thomas Steen continued to serve as co-captains.

Regular season

Final standings

Schedule and results

Playoffs
The Jets missed the playoffs.

Player statistics

Regular season
Scoring

Goaltending

Awards and records

Transactions

Trades

Draft picks
Winnipeg selected the following players at the 1990 NHL Entry Draft, which was held at BC Place in Vancouver, British Columbia on June 16, 1990.

NHL Amateur Draft

Farm teams

See also
 1990–91 NHL season

References

External links

Winnipeg Jets season, 1990-91
Winnipeg Jets (1972–1996) seasons
Winn